Jaliq (also Romanized as Jālīq) is a village in Qeshlaq Rural District, in the Central District of Ahar County, East Azerbaijan Province, Iran. At the 2006 census, its population was 16, in 6 families.

References 

Populated places in Ahar County